Daniel Bärwolf (born 13 May 1973) is a German former professional footballer who played as a striker.

References

External links

1973 births
Living people
Sportspeople from Erfurt
German footballers
Association football forwards
FC Rot-Weiß Erfurt players
1. FC Lokomotive Leipzig players
FC Carl Zeiss Jena players
VfB Lübeck players
2. Bundesliga players
Footballers from Thuringia